This is an overview of the 2000 Iranian legislative election in Tehran, Rey, Shemiranat and Eslamshahr electoral district.

Results

First round 
Official results declared by the Ministry of Interior are as follows:

Second round

Analysis
15 electoral lists were issued for 30 seats in Tehran, Rey, Shemiranat and Eslamshahr electoral district, endorsing a total of 113 individuals. The 113 listed candidates received an average of 437,459 votes, while 723 unlisted candidates received only 5,524 on average.

Notes and references

Parliamentary elections in Tehran
2000s in Tehran
2000 elections in Iran